Fazle Elahi was a Bangladeshi freedom fighter and politician from Noakhali belonging to Jatiya Party. He was a member of the Jatiya Sangsad.

Biography
Elahi was a freedom fighter. He was an organizer of the Liberation War of Bangladesh too. He established Sonapur Degree College and Sonapur Collegiate School. He was elected as a member of the Jatiya Sangsad from Noakhali-4 in 1988.

Elahi died on 13 August 2018 at the age of 63.

References

2018 deaths
People from Noakhali District
4th Jatiya Sangsad members
Jatiya Party politicians
People of the Bangladesh Liberation War